Kate Daudy (born 1970) is a British visual artist.

Themes
The concept of writing on objects originates in the beginning of Chinese civilization, when tortoise shells and scapulae were used to predict the future. These 'oracle bones' would go through a process of being burnt in the embers of a fire; Chinese shamans would divine the future from the manner in which the bones and shells cracked and would subsequently inscribe their predictions on them. This was a practice particularly prevalent in the Shang Dynasty(1600-1046 BC). The calligraphic writing or inscribing of poems onto objects became an elevated art form in itself, perpetuated by the ruling Emperors, who would compose poems to be inscribed onto paintings or works of art of special significance to them. By perpetuating this literary tradition as a contemporary plastic art form Daudy's work has brought these ancient concepts back to mainland China itself, where the tradition had been lost.

Kate Daudy also creates written interventions, mostly in public spaces in nature, on walls and with fabric, based on an ancient Chinese literary practice of seeking to understand the universe through art and nature. Daudy's Chinese studies have driven an interest in calligraphy and Chinese philosophy, and have led to her working in a variety of mediums, including using felt fabric to create her writings.

She uses felt as her medium, which is for her a symbol of redemption, as it is made from the rubbish of the fabric industry.

Career
Her first show "Written in Water" (2009) with Grant White at the Galerie Marie Victoire Poliakoff in Paris examined the memories associated with items of clothing, inscribing vintage dresses with poems that reflected their identity. Le Figaro compared Daudy's and White's work to that of Jean Cocteau and Elsa Schiaparelli.

Yellow Mountains, Red Letters exhibited at Bonham's London 2010 featured her calligraphic works on photographs by Chinese art specialist Daniel Eskenazi. 

Daudy is a committed peace advocate. One of her most celebrated works, the "War Dress" was commissioned by the Southbank Centre, London for the Poetry International festival. It featured Wilfred Owen's Dulce et Decorum est inscribed in khaki letters down the train of a wedding dress.

She has since collaborated with Lemn Sissay, Glyndebourne Opera, Yang Lian, House of Voltaire[6], Grant White, the Southbank Centre, Poetry International, other artists and poets. Her work features in museums and major private collections throughout the world.

2016/2017
Astronauts of Inner Space (2016) at 50 GOLBOURNE represented a collaboration with Italian designer Paola Petrobelli and Swiss sound artist Philippe Ciompi, evoking William Burroughs' 'inner space', where the conscious and  the unconscious combine to provoke memories and thoughts from the observer and to celebrate a full absorption into the living of everyday life.

In 2016 she was designated by ONUART and commissioned to work on a used UNHCR refugee tent provided to her, through their introduction, by the United Nations High Commission for Refugees (UNHCR). The tent has since travelled and has been shown (as "Am I my brother's keeper?") in venues around continental Europe and the United Kingdom, including the Flagey Building in Brussels, the Iglesia del Seminario and the Hay Festival in Segovia, the Chiesa Santa Rosalia in Palermo, the Migration Museum, the School of Oriental and African Studies, the Saatchi Gallery, and St Paul's Cathedral in London, and the Edinburgh Festival.

The research in which Daudy engaged for the purpose of the refugee tent led to a series of new chapters in her work, inspired by the people she encountered - both refugees and those individuals connected to them. Daudy embarked upon a prolific campaign of written interventions in public and private places, across Europe, the UK and the Middle East, conveying positive, thought-provoking messages and ideas. She has written across more than 250 places, from tree stumps to prestigious museums, rubbish bins, fire hydrants, world-famous restaurants, bus shelters, greasy spoons, grocery shops, a refugee registration centre, youth centres, libraries, schools and street corners.

With the support of UNHCR, Daudy has written messages of bravery and hope that come directly from the Syrian refugee camps in Jordan. Her writing is impermanent.

In 2016/2017 her show, This is Water, an open-air display at Yorkshire Sculpture Park, referred to an essay by David Foster Wallace which alludes to how easy it is to forget what is ‘hidden in plain sight all around us.

2018/2019
In 2018/2019 Daudy embarked on “Everything is Connected”, a global art and science collaboration with Konstantin Novoselov, the Nobel Prize laureate in Physics in 2010.

"We can talk about it in the car", a city-wide exhibition programme, was commissioned from Daudy by Artreach as part of Journeys Festival International in Manchester in 2018.

From November 2019 Daudy was appointed by the Saatchi Gallery in London as one of two artists-in-residence, with a brief to respond to its exhibition, “Tutankhamun: Treasures of the Golden Pharaoh”. Her show (“It wasn’t that at all”) explored issues of death, family, home, identity, absence and loss.

References

External links
 
 
 Kate Daudy Conceptual Artist, Sculptor
 Kate Daudy's "psychological landscape"This is Water, Yorkshire Sculpture Park

1970 births
Living people
British conceptual artists
Women conceptual artists
British installation artists
British contemporary artists
History of fashion
Artists from London
Guerilla artists
21st-century British women artists